The 1990 Philippine Basketball Association (PBA) First Conference was the opening conference of the 1990 PBA season. It started on February 18 and ended on May 15, 1990. The tournament allows one-import each per team.

Format
The following format will be observed for the duration of the conference:
The teams were divided into 2 groups.

Group A:
Formula Shell Zoom Masters
Pepsi Hotshots
Presto Tivolis
San Miguel Beermen

Group B:
Alaska Air Force
Añejo Rum 65ers
Purefoods Hotdogs
Pop Cola Sizzlers

Teams in a group will play against each other twice and against teams in the other group once; 10 games per team; Teams are then seeded by basis on win–loss records. Ties are broken among point differentials of the tied teams. Standings will be determined in one league table; teams do not qualify by basis of groupings.
The top five teams after the eliminations will advance to the semifinals.
 Semifinals will be two round robin affairs with the remaining teams. Results from the elimination round will be carried over. A playoff incentive for a finals berth will be given to the team that will win five of their eight semifinal games.
 The top two teams (or the top team and the winner of the playoff incentive) will face each other in a best-of-seven championship series. The next two teams will qualify for a best-of-five playoff for third place.

Elimination round

Team standings

Semifinals

Team standings

Cumulative standings

Semifinal round standings:

Third place playoffs

Finals

References

External links
 PBA.ph

PBA First Conference
First Conference